Joe Malloori is an Indian actor who has appeared in Tamil language films. After making his debut in Prabhu Solomon's Kumki (2012), he has appeared as antagonist and supporting actor in other ventures.

Career
Joe Malloori had been a Tamil writer, notably working on poems and documentaries including Paal Nilappaadhaiyil. He made his acting debut in Prabhu Solomon's Kumki (2012), appearing as Mathayaan, a tribal leader. He won critical acclaim for his performance, with a reviewer from The Hindu noting "Solomon’s choice of Joe Malluri for the strong role of Mathayaan is laudable." He has since appeared as in other ventures including Jilla and Rummy.

Notable filmography

See also
Cinema of India

References

Male actors in Tamil cinema
Living people
Male actors from Chennai
Indian male film actors
1964 births